Ameson Year in China (AYC) (Chinese Simplified: 美国青年教学使者; Pinyin: měiguó qīngnián jiàoxué shǐzhě) is a program offering opportunities for college graduates to become Educational Ambassadors by spending a year teaching and learning at public schools across China.

Program

Ameson Year in China is a program for college graduates to provide future career awareness by spending one academic year by teaching and studying in an assigned site across China. Each week, AYC participants spend twenty hours teaching, ten hours in the office or in support of students' activities, and ten hours in collaborative or self-directed pursuits, such as language learning, exploration, and community engagement.

Background
In recent decades the Ameson Education and Cultural Exchange Foundation saw the importance of maintaining positive U.S.-China relations, and believed that dialogue and exchange could support lasting stability between the two countries. The organization sought future leaders to fulfill that mission through its Ameson Year in China (AYC) program.

References

External links
 AYC Main Page
 News articles for Ameson Foundation
 《展示自己 孩子做主》, 金羊网,www.ycwb.com in Chinese
  “年轻的时候去中国”, 人民网, world.people.com.cn, in Chinese

Cultural exchange